Wiley Park railway station is located on the Bankstown line, serving the Sydney suburb of Wiley Park. It is served by Sydney Trains T3 Bankstown line services.

History
Wiley Park station opened on 19 June 1938, well after the line from Belmore to Bankstown opened in 1909, to provide an interchange with King Georges Road. While adjacent stations have island platforms, this station was built with side platforms and the architecture of the station buildings is significantly different.

Platforms & services

Transport links
Punchbowl Bus Company operates two routes via Wiley Park station:
942: Campsie to Lugarno
S14: Lakemba to Mount Lewis

Wiley Park station is served by one NightRide route:
N40: East Hills station to Town Hall station

References

External links

Wiley Park station details Transport for New South Wales
Wiley Park Metro station Sydney Metro

City of Canterbury-Bankstown
Railway stations in Sydney
Railway stations in Australia opened in 1938
Bankstown railway line